Aldon Douglas Morris (born June 15, 1949) is a professor of sociology and an award-winning scholar, with interests including social movements, civil rights, and social inequality. He is the 2021 president of the American Sociological Association.

Early life and education
Morris, an African-American and the grandson of sharecroppers, was born in rural Tutwiler, Mississippi. As a child he experienced Jim Crow racism and segregation; one of his earliest memories was the lynching of 14-year-old Emmett Till. He moved to Chicago with his family, and enrolled at Southeast Community College in 1968. Morris studied sociology and social movements at Bradley University and the State University of New York, Stony Brook, receiving his PhD in 1980.

Career 
Morris was an associate professor of sociology at the University of Michigan from 1980 to 1990. He joined the faculty of Northwestern University in 1988, where he now serves as the Leon Forrest professor of sociology and African-American Studies. Previously at Northwestern, he chaired the sociology department, directed Asian American Studies, served as associate dean for faculty affairs, and served as interim dean for the Weinberg College of Arts and Sciences.

Morris was inspired by the moving oration of Martin Luther King Jr. and the scholarship of sociologist W.E.B. Du Bois, the first black man to earn a doctorate from Harvard University. In 2005, Morris and a group of peers persuaded the American Sociological Association to rename their top award after Du Bois. In his 2015 book, The Scholar Denied: W. E. B. Du Bois and the Birth of Modern Sociology, Morris argued that Du Bois was the founder of modern American sociology, and that his contributions to the field were suppressed for decades due to institutional racism.

In 2019, Morris was elected as President-Elect of the American Sociological Association. Morris will serve as the 112th President the Association in 2021, succeeding Christine Williams.

Selected publications

Selected awards 
 1986: Distinguished Contribution to Scholarship Award, American Sociological Association
 1988: Outstanding Leadership Award, Association of Black Sociologists (Morris served as president from 1986 to 1988)
 2006: Joseph Himes award for Lifetime Achievement for a Career of Distinguished Scholarship, Association of Black Sociologists
 2009: Cox-Johnson-Frazier award, American Sociological Association
 2013: A. Wade Smith Award for Teaching, Mentoring and Service, Association of Black Sociologists 
 2016: R.R. Hawkins Award and Award for Excellence in Social Sciences, PROSE Awards
 2020: W.E.B. Du Bois Career of Distinguished Scholarship Award

References

External links 
 

1949 births
Living people
American sociologists
African-American social scientists
African-American non-fiction writers
American non-fiction writers
Northwestern University faculty
Stony Brook University alumni
Bradley University alumni
People from Tutwiler, Mississippi
Academics from Mississippi
21st-century African-American people
20th-century African-American people